Kites are Fun is the first album by The Free Design, released in 1967. The group was signed to the Project 3 label after a demo recording that was completed with the assistance of the band's father.

The tracks are composed of precise instrumental arrangements with high ranges in complex vocal harmonies. The title track was the group's only charting single, reaching #33 on the Billboard adult contemporary chart and #114 on the Billboard Hot 100/Bubbling Under chart.

Track listing
 "Kites are Fun" (Chris Dedrick)
 "Make the Madness Stop" (Chris Dedrick)
 "When Love is Young" (Sandy Dedrick/Stephanie Dedrick)
 "The Proper Ornaments" (Chris Dedrick)
 "My Brother Woody" (Chris Dedrick)
 "59th Street Bridge Song" (Paul Simon)
 "Don't Turn Away" (Chris Dedrick)
 "Umbrellas" (Bruce Dedrick)
 "Michelle" (Lennon–McCartney)
 "Never Tell the World" (Sandy Dedrick/Chris Dedrick)
 "A Man and a Woman" (Francis Lai)
 "Stay Another Season" (Chris Dedrick)

The title track, released as a single, was on Billboards "Bubbling Under Hot 100" and "Top 40 Easy Listening" surveys.

Charts
"Kites Are Fun" (song)
Billboard adult contemporary chart: #33
Billboard pop chart: #114

Personnel
 Bruce Dedrick - vocals, guitar
 Chris Dedrick - vocals, guitar
 Sandra Dedrick - vocals, keyboards
 Russ Savakus - Fender bass guitar
 Bill LaVorgna - drums
 Ralph Casale - guitar
 Jay Berliner - guitar
 Tony Mottola - guitar
 Marvin Stamm - trumpet
 Ted Weiss - trumpet
 Joe Wilder - trumpet
 Rusty Dedrick - trumpet
 Bernie Glow - trumpet
 Buddy Morrow - trombone
 Ray Alonge - French horn
 Tony Miranda - French horn
 George Ricci - cello
 Romeo Penque - woodwind
 Ray Beckenstein - woodwind
 Phil Bodner - woodwind
 Stanley Webb - woodwind
 Paul Griffin - organ
 Dick Hyman - organ
 Stan Freeman - harpsichord
 Bob Rosengarden - vibraphone

"Kites are Fun" was covered by Tomorrow's World for the Songs for the Jet Set, Volume 1 compilation album.

References

1967 debut albums
The Free Design albums
Albums produced by Enoch Light